(1828–1907) was the first Mayor in Dogo Yunomachi (道後湯之町) which is famous for Dogo Onsen. He made today's Dogo Onsen while he was the Mayor. He thought the tourism era would come in the future, so he made a plan to make the city into a resort city.

Early life and education
Narukawa Yukiya was born in 1828 to Narukawa Kunio, a Dogo physician, and his wife, Maki. Yukiya liked studying. He was taught by Mikami Zean, a doctor in Matsuyama-han which is today’s Matsuyama. In 1845, when he was adopted by Abe Yasuo, a low-level samurai, he became Abe Yukiya, and in 1848, he married Yasuo's daughter, Isa. In 1855, Abe Yukiya founded "Rōbai Gejuku," a private school. In 1868 when the Japanese period changed to the Meiji era, Abe Yukiya already had three children: Onoe (first son), Ran (first daughter), and Momoyo (second daughter). When his eldest son, Onoe, reached adulthood, Yukiya established him as the head of the household. Then, Yukiya himself left the Abe family and took the name of Isaniwa Yukiya.

As Matsuyama was reorganized during the abolition of the han system, Isaniwa Yukiya began working in a city office of Matsuyama han in 1870 and in 1873, and then he worked in a city office in some prefectures in Shikoku between 1877 and 1886. Then in 1890 he was appointed as Dōgo Yunomachi’s first mayor (chōchō) Town Head in 1890. He did this job for 12 years.

Dogo Yunomachi before Yukiya 
Dogo Yunomachi means the hot spring town of Dogo. The spring had good quality and visiting it was cheap, so it was popular among the people of the town. Because the flow of hot spring water was small, it couldn't be divided and brought to hotels. Since about 1603, the hot spring had been divided into three hot spring rooms and a free outdoor hot spring for cures. Those two springs supported Dogo Yunomachi. However, both of them were quite old and needed to be renewed.

Yukiya's achievements as the mayor 

During the two years that Isaniwa Yukiya served as a mayor, he changed many things. First, he began charging money fora free outdoor hot spring for cures, because the hot spring was old, it needed to renew. Then he rebuilt the hot spring for cures in 1892. And then he planned to renew the main hot spring. Yukiya planned Dogo Onsen to have third floor which was rare in those days for Japan, Japanese style mixed with European style building, red and blue Giyaman glass (Dutch style glass) used  and looks rich and powerful building, because the main hot spring had good quality, Yukiya  didn't want to Dogo Onsen looks usual type of other buildings. He asked Sakamoto Hachiro, a carpenter for castle, to make it and Sakamoto built it in 1894. It took for 20 months to build. And he also founded Dogo train corporation and he asked to make the train rail to Dogo through Ichiban-cho in 1897, because Yukiya  thought Dogo Onsen station makes people come and visit to Dogo Yunomachi. And in the same year, he made the park around the Dogo Onsen and for people to enjoy sweets, he made red and white Yuzarashi Dango, today's Botchan Dango. However, most people of the city disagreed with his these ideas until they saw the new Dogo Onsen.

Disagreement

First, when Yukiya charged money for the outdoor hot spring for cures, many people disagreed with the idea, because if people of Dogo Yunomachi were charged for the hot spring, Dogo hotels' business   would suffer. But Yukiya needed money to renew it, so he ignored them. Second, people objected to paying money for the construction. Yukiya said "Dogo Onsen should be a fabulous building, to make people to visit, "It is now hard for us, but this experience will change this city in the future and it will be a great city," and "this plan is not rash!" After contending with their disagreement and explaining his ideas many times, the people of the city changed their idea and helped him.

Today's Dogo Onsen

Isaniwa Yukiya  ended his job as mayor in 1902. And he died in 1907. Today, Dogo Onsen has become famous and many  people visit on tours. Dogo Onsen is the most recognizable symbol of Matsuyama.

References
 Ehime Shinbunsha, Hakkutsu Ehimebito—Kindai wo hiraita 101nin, (Matsuyama: Ehime Shinbunsha, 2002).
Katō Keiichi, Dōgo no yoake —Isaniwa Okina monogatari (Matsuyama: Dōgo Onsen Ryokan Kyōdō Kumiai, 1988).
 Nikami Susumu, "'Ehimeken no sōseki wo sasaeta nōri Isaniwa Yukiya" [Official Isaniwa Yukiya who supported the genesis of Ehime prefecture] Iyo shidan 336 (1 Jan. 2005): 1-24.

Notes

1828 births
1907 deaths
People from Matsuyama, Ehime
People of Meiji-period Japan